This list of 1960 motorsport champions is a list of national or international auto racing series with a Championship decided by the points or positions earned by a driver from multiple races.

Some titles may be from single events.

Formula cars

Sports car

Touring car

Stock car racing

Motorcycle

See also
 List of motorsport championships
 Auto racing

Champions
1960